Peucetia is a genus of lynx spiders that is found worldwide.

While P. viridana is found only in Asia, the similar named P. viridans (Green Lynx Spider) occurs only from the southern United States to Venezuela.

The only Peucetia species to occur in the United States, apart from P. viridans (which occurs in the south from coast to coast) is P. longipalpis, which occurs in the southwestern US to Belize.

Species
 it contains the following forty-seven species:
 Peucetia akwadaensis Patel, 1978 — India, China
 Peucetia albescens L. Koch, 1878 — Australia (Queensland)
 Peucetia ananthakrishnani Murugesan, Mathew, Sudhikumar, Sunish, Biju & Sebastian, 2006 — India
 Peucetia arabica Simon, 1882 — Greece, North, East Africa, Middle East
 Peucetia ashae Gajbe & Gajbe, 1999 — India
 Peucetia betlaensis Saha & Raychaudhuri, 2007 — India
 Peucetia biharensis Gajbe, 1999 — India
 Peucetia casseli Simon, 1900 — West, Central Africa
 Peucetia cayapa Santos & Brescovit, 2003 — Ecuador, Peru
 Peucetia choprai Tikader, 1965 — India
 Peucetia crucifera Lawrence, 1927 — Namibia, Botswana, Zimbabwe, South Africa
 Peucetia elegans (Blackwall, 1864) — India
 Peucetia flava Keyserling, 1877 — Venezuela to Argentina
 Peucetia formosensis Kishida, 1930 — Taiwan
 Peucetia gauntleta Saha & Raychaudhuri, 2004 — India
 Peucetia gerhardi van Niekerk & Dippenaar-Schoeman, 1994 — West, Central, East Africa
 Peucetia graminea Pocock, 1900 — India
 Peucetia harishankarensis Biswas, 1975 — India
 Peucetia jabalpurensis Gajbe & Gajbe, 1999 — India
 Peucetia ketani Gajbe, 1992 — India
 Peucetia latikae Tikader, 1970 — India, China
 Peucetia lesserti van Niekerk & Dippenaar-Schoeman, 1994 — Niger, Kenya
 Peucetia longipalpis F. O. Pickard-Cambridge, 1902 — USA to Venezuela
 Peucetia lucasi (Vinson, 1863) — Botswana, South Africa, Comoros, Mayotte, Madagascar
 Peucetia macroglossa Mello-Leitão, 1929 — Colombia, Brazil, Guyana
 Peucetia maculifera Pocock, 1900 — South Africa, Lesotho
 Peucetia madagascariensis (Vinson, 1863) — Comoros, Mayotte, Madagascar
 Peucetia madalenae van Niekerk & Dippenaar-Schoeman, 1994 — Mozambique, South Africa
 Peucetia margaritata Hogg, 1914 — Australia (Montebello Is.)
 Peucetia myanmarensis Barrion & Litsinger, 1995 — Myanmar
 Peucetia nicolae van Niekerk & Dippenaar-Schoeman, 1994 — South Africa
 Peucetia pawani Gajbe, 1999 — India
 Peucetia phantasma Ahmed, Satam, Khalap & Mohan, 2015 — India
 Peucetia procera Thorell, 1887 — Myanmar
 Peucetia pulchra (Blackwall, 1865) — Central, Eastern, Southern Africa, Seychelles
 Peucetia punjabensis Gajbe, 1999 — India
 Peucetia rajani Gajbe, 1999 — India
 Peucetia ranganathani Biswas & Roy, 2005 — India
 Peucetia rubrolineata Keyserling, 1877 — Panama to Argentina
 Peucetia striata Karsch, 1878 — Yemen to South Africa, Comoros. Introduced to St. Helena
 Peucetia transvaalica Simon, 1896 — Central, Southern Africa
 Peucetia virescens (O. Pickard-Cambridge, 1872) — Turkey, Middle East
 Peucetia viridana (Stoliczka, 1869) — Pakistan, India, Sri Lanka, Bangladesh, Myanmar
 Peucetia viridans (Hentz, 1832) — North & Central America, Caribbean, Venezuela
 Peucetia viridis (Blackwall, 1858) — Spain, Greece, Africa, Middle East. Introduced to Caribbean Is.
 Peucetia viveki Gajbe, 1999 — India
 Peucetia yogeshi Gajbe, 1999 — India

References

Oxyopidae
Araneomorphae genera
Spiders of Asia
Spiders of North America
Spiders of South America